Wila Sirka (Aymara wila blood, red, sirka vein of the body or a mine, "red vein", also spelled Wila Sirca) is a  mountain in the Bolivian Andes. It is located in the Potosí Department, Tomás Frías Province, Yocalla Municipality.

References 

Mountains of Potosí Department